"Non lasciarmi mai" is the second single release from the fifth studio album of Italian singer Alexia. The song is about Alexia being pleased to have her lover and the direction her life is going, comparing him as the sun in her life and her fear of being left alone. The title translates as 'Not to leave me ever'. The track contains lyrics in both English and Italian.

An English version featured on the international release of the album Alexia entitled "Don't Leave Me This Way". The theme of the song differs slightly in that although Alexia likes some of what her lover does, yet he doesn't completely leave her satisfied and that she doesn't want to be left in her current way of being moderately satisfied.

Although listed by the Italian Wikipedia Alexia page as being a radio single, a physical CD was released on 24 June 2002 with "Se Un Gornio" as the B side, with the song being listed as a single on Alexia's official website.

The track featured on both of Sony's budget Alexia compilations, Collections and Le Pui' Belle Di.

Official versions 
Album version 3:29
Single version 3:33
English version (Don't Leave Me This Way) 3:29

References 

2002 singles
Alexia (Italian singer) songs
Songs written by Alexia (Italian singer)
Songs written by Massimo Marcolini
Sony Music singles